The International Space Station (ISS) is the largest modular space station in low Earth orbit. The project involves five space agencies: the United States' NASA, Russia's Roscosmos, Japan's JAXA, Europe's ESA, and Canada's CSA. The ownership and use of the space station is established by intergovernmental treaties and agreements. The station serves as a microgravity and space environment research laboratory in which scientific research is conducted in astrobiology, astronomy, meteorology, physics, and other fields. The ISS is suited for testing the spacecraft systems and equipment required for possible future long-duration missions to the Moon and Mars.

The ISS programme evolved from the Space Station Freedom, a 1984 American proposal to construct a permanently crewed Earth-orbiting station, and the contemporaneous Soviet/Russian Mir-2 proposal from 1976 with similar aims. The ISS is the ninth space station to be inhabited by crews, following the Soviet and later Russian Salyut, Almaz, and Mir stations and the American Skylab. It is the largest artificial object in the solar system and the largest satellite in low Earth orbit, regularly visible to the naked eye from Earth's surface. The ISS circles the Earth in roughly 93 minutes, completing  orbits per day.

The station is divided into two sections: the Russian Orbital Segment (ROS) is operated by Russia, while the United States Orbital Segment (USOS) is run by the United States as well as by the other states. The Russian segment includes six modules. The US segment includes ten modules, whose support services are distributed 76.6% for NASA, 12.8% for JAXA, 8.3% for ESA and 2.3% for CSA.

Roscosmos had previously endorsed the continued operation of ROS through 2024, having proposed using elements of the segment to construct a new Russian space station called OPSEK. However, continued cooperation has been rendered uncertain by the 2022 Russian invasion of Ukraine and subsequent international sanctions on Russia, who theoretically, may lower, redirect, or cut funding from their side of the space station due to the sanctions set on them.

The first ISS component was launched in 1998, and the first long-term residents arrived on 2 November 2000 after being launched from the Baikonur Cosmodrome on 31 October 2000. The latest major pressurised module, Nauka, was fitted in 2021, a little over ten years after the previous major addition, Leonardo in 2011. Development and assembly of the station continues, with an experimental inflatable space habitat added in 2016, and several major new Russian elements scheduled for launch starting in 2021. In January 2022, the station's operation authorization was extended to 2030, with funding secured within the United States through that year. There have been calls to privatize ISS operations after that point to pursue future Moon and Mars missions, with former NASA Administrator Jim Bridenstine stating: "given our current budget constraints, if we want to go to the moon and we want to go to Mars, we need to commercialize low Earth orbit and go on to the next step."

The ISS consists of pressurised habitation modules, structural trusses, photovoltaic solar arrays, thermal radiators, docking ports, experiment bays and robotic arms. Major ISS modules have been launched by Russian Proton and Soyuz rockets and US Space Shuttles. The station is serviced by a variety of visiting spacecraft: the Russian Soyuz and Progress, the SpaceX Dragon 2, and the Northrop Grumman Space Systems Cygnus, and formerly the European Automated Transfer Vehicle (ATV), the Japanese H-II Transfer Vehicle, and SpaceX Dragon 1. The Dragon spacecraft allows the return of pressurised cargo to Earth, which is used, for example, to repatriate scientific experiments for further analysis. , 251 astronauts, cosmonauts, and space tourists from 20 different nations have visited the space station, many of them multiple times.

History

Purpose
The ISS was originally intended to be a laboratory, observatory, and factory while providing transportation, maintenance, and a low Earth orbit staging base for possible future missions to the Moon, Mars, and asteroids. However, not all of the uses envisioned in the initial memorandum of understanding between NASA and Roscosmos have been realised. In the 2010 United States National Space Policy, the ISS was given additional roles of serving commercial, diplomatic, and educational purposes.

Scientific research

The ISS provides a platform to conduct scientific research, with power, data, cooling, and crew available to support experiments. Small uncrewed spacecraft can also provide platforms for experiments, especially those involving zero gravity and exposure to space, but space stations offer a long-term environment where studies can be performed potentially for decades, combined with ready access by human researchers.

The ISS simplifies individual experiments by allowing groups of experiments to share the same launches and crew time. Research is conducted in a wide variety of fields, including astrobiology, astronomy, physical sciences, materials science, space weather, meteorology, and human research including space medicine and the life sciences. Scientists on Earth have timely access to the data and can suggest experimental modifications to the crew. If follow-on experiments are necessary, the routinely scheduled launches of resupply craft allows new hardware to be launched with relative ease. Crews fly expeditions of several months' duration, providing approximately 160 person-hours per week of labour with a crew of six. However, a considerable amount of crew time is taken up by station maintenance.

Perhaps the most notable ISS experiment is the Alpha Magnetic Spectrometer (AMS), which is intended to detect dark matter and answer other fundamental questions about our universe. According to NASA, the AMS is as important as the Hubble Space Telescope. Currently docked on station, it could not have been easily accommodated on a free flying satellite platform because of its power and bandwidth needs. On 3 April 2013, scientists reported that hints of dark matter may have been detected by the AMS. According to the scientists, "The first results from the space-borne Alpha Magnetic Spectrometer confirm an unexplained excess of high-energy positrons in Earth-bound cosmic rays".

The space environment is hostile to life. Unprotected presence in space is characterised by an intense radiation field (consisting primarily of protons and other subatomic charged particles from the solar wind, in addition to cosmic rays), high vacuum, extreme temperatures, and microgravity. Some simple forms of life called extremophiles, as well as small invertebrates called tardigrades can survive in this environment in an extremely dry state through desiccation.

Medical research improves knowledge about the effects of long-term space exposure on the human body, including muscle atrophy, bone loss, and fluid shift. These data will be used to determine whether high duration human spaceflight and space colonisation are feasible. In 2006, data on bone loss and muscular atrophy suggested that there would be a significant risk of fractures and movement problems if astronauts landed on a planet after a lengthy interplanetary cruise, such as the six-month interval required to travel to Mars.

Medical studies are conducted aboard the ISS on behalf of the National Space Biomedical Research Institute (NSBRI). Prominent among these is the Advanced Diagnostic Ultrasound in Microgravity study in which astronauts perform ultrasound scans under the guidance of remote experts. The study considers the diagnosis and treatment of medical conditions in space. Usually, there is no physician on board the ISS and diagnosis of medical conditions is a challenge. It is anticipated that remotely guided ultrasound scans will have application on Earth in emergency and rural care situations where access to a trained physician is difficult.

In August 2020, scientists reported that bacteria from Earth, particularly Deinococcus radiodurans bacteria, which is highly resistant to environmental hazards, were found to survive for three years in outer space, based on studies conducted on the International Space Station. These findings supported the notion of panspermia, the hypothesis that life exists throughout the Universe, distributed in various ways, including space dust, meteoroids, asteroids, comets, planetoids or contaminated spacecraft.

Remote sensing of the Earth, astronomy, and deep space research on the ISS have dramatically increased during the 2010s after the completion of the US Orbital Segment in 2011. Throughout the more than 20 years of the ISS program researchers aboard the ISS and on the ground have examined aerosols, ozone, lightning, and oxides in Earth's atmosphere, as well as the Sun, cosmic rays, cosmic dust, antimatter, and dark matter in the universe. Examples of Earth-viewing remote sensing experiments that have flown on the ISS are the Orbiting Carbon Observatory 3, ISS-RapidScat, ECOSTRESS, the Global Ecosystem Dynamics Investigation, and the Cloud Aerosol Transport System. ISS-based astronomy telescopes and experiments include SOLAR, the Neutron Star Interior Composition Explorer, the Calorimetric Electron Telescope, the Monitor of All-sky X-ray Image (MAXI), and the Alpha Magnetic Spectrometer.

Freefall

Gravity at the altitude of the ISS is approximately 90% as strong as at Earth's surface, but objects in orbit are in a continuous state of freefall, resulting in an apparent state of weightlessness. This perceived weightlessness is disturbed by five effects:
 Drag from the residual atmosphere.
 Vibration from the movements of mechanical systems and the crew.
 Actuation of the on-board attitude control moment gyroscopes.
 Thruster firings for attitude or orbital changes.
 Gravity-gradient effects, also known as tidal effects. Items at different locations within the ISS would, if not attached to the station, follow slightly different orbits. Being mechanically connected these items experience small forces that keep the station moving as a rigid body.

Researchers are investigating the effect of the station's near-weightless environment on the evolution, development, growth and internal processes of plants and animals. In response to some of the data, NASA wants to investigate microgravity's effects on the growth of three-dimensional, human-like tissues and the unusual protein crystals that can be formed in space.

Investigating the physics of fluids in microgravity will provide better models of the behaviour of fluids. Because fluids can be almost completely combined in microgravity, physicists investigate fluids that do not mix well on Earth. Examining reactions that are slowed by low gravity and low temperatures will improve our understanding of superconductivity.

The study of materials science is an important ISS research activity, with the objective of reaping economic benefits through the improvement of techniques used on the ground. Other areas of interest include the effect of low gravity on combustion, through the study of the efficiency of burning and control of emissions and pollutants. These findings may improve knowledge about energy production and lead to economic and environmental benefits.

Exploration

The ISS provides a location in the relative safety of low Earth orbit to test spacecraft systems that will be required for long-duration missions to the Moon and Mars. This provides experience in operations, maintenance as well as repair and replacement activities on-orbit. This will help develop essential skills in operating spacecraft farther from Earth, reduce mission risks, and advance the capabilities of interplanetary spacecraft. Referring to the MARS-500 experiment, a crew isolation experiment conducted on Earth, ESA states that "Whereas the ISS is essential for answering questions concerning the possible impact of weightlessness, radiation and other space-specific factors, aspects such as the effect of long-term isolation and confinement can be more appropriately addressed via ground-based simulations". Sergey Krasnov, the head of human space flight programmes for Russia's space agency, Roscosmos, in 2011 suggested a "shorter version" of MARS-500 may be carried out on the ISS.

In 2009, noting the value of the partnership framework itself, Sergey Krasnov wrote, "When compared with partners acting separately, partners developing complementary abilities and resources could give us much more assurance of the success and safety of space exploration. The ISS is helping further advance near-Earth space exploration and realisation of prospective programmes of research and exploration of the Solar system, including the Moon and Mars." A crewed mission to Mars may be a multinational effort involving space agencies and countries outside the current ISS partnership. In 2010, ESA Director-General Jean-Jacques Dordain stated his agency was ready to propose to the other four partners that China, India and South Korea be invited to join the ISS partnership. NASA chief Charles Bolden stated in February 2011, "Any mission to Mars is likely to be a global effort". Currently, US federal legislation prevents NASA co-operation with China on space projects.

Education and cultural outreach

The ISS crew provides opportunities for students on Earth by running student-developed experiments, making educational demonstrations, allowing for student participation in classroom versions of ISS experiments, and directly engaging students using radio, and email. ESA offers a wide range of free teaching materials that can be downloaded for use in classrooms. In one lesson, students can navigate a 3D model of the interior and exterior of the ISS, and face spontaneous challenges to solve in real time.

The Japanese Aerospace Exploration Agency (JAXA) aims to inspire children to "pursue craftsmanship" and to heighten their "awareness of the importance of life and their responsibilities in society". Through a series of education guides, students develop a deeper understanding of the past and near-term future of crewed space flight, as well as that of Earth and life. In the JAXA "Seeds in Space" experiments, the mutation effects of spaceflight on plant seeds aboard the ISS are explored by growing sunflower seeds that have flown on the ISS for about nine months. In the first phase of Kibō utilisation from 2008 to mid-2010, researchers from more than a dozen Japanese universities conducted experiments in diverse fields.

Cultural activities are another major objective of the ISS programme. Tetsuo Tanaka, the director of JAXA's Space Environment and Utilization Center, has said: "There is something about space that touches even people who are not interested in science."

Amateur Radio on the ISS (ARISS) is a volunteer programme that encourages students worldwide to pursue careers in science, technology, engineering, and mathematics, through amateur radio communications opportunities with the ISS crew. ARISS is an international working group, consisting of delegations from nine countries including several in Europe, as well as Japan, Russia, Canada, and the United States. In areas where radio equipment cannot be used, speakerphones connect students to ground stations which then connect the calls to the space station.

First Orbit is a 2011 feature-length documentary film about Vostok 1, the first crewed space flight around the Earth. By matching the orbit of the ISS to that of Vostok 1 as closely as possible, in terms of ground path and time of day, documentary filmmaker Christopher Riley and ESA astronaut Paolo Nespoli were able to film the view that Yuri Gagarin saw on his pioneering orbital space flight. This new footage was cut together with the original Vostok 1 mission audio recordings sourced from the Russian State Archive. Nespoli is credited as the director of photography for this documentary film, as he recorded the majority of the footage himself during Expedition 26/27. The film was streamed in a global YouTube premiere in 2011 under a free licence through the website firstorbit.org.

In May 2013, commander Chris Hadfield shot a music video of David Bowie's "Space Oddity" on board the station, which was released on YouTube. It was the first music video ever to be filmed in space.

In November 2017, while participating in Expedition 52/53 on the ISS, Paolo Nespoli made two recordings of his spoken voice (one in English and the other in his native Italian), for use on Wikipedia articles. These were the first content made in space specifically for Wikipedia.

In November 2021, a virtual reality exhibit called The Infinite featuring life aboard the ISS was announced.

Construction

Manufacturing

Since the International Space Station is a multi-national collaborative project, the components for in-orbit assembly were manufactured in various countries around the world. Beginning in the mid-1990s, the U.S. components Destiny, Unity, the Integrated Truss Structure, and the solar arrays were fabricated at the Marshall Space Flight Center and the Michoud Assembly Facility. These modules were delivered to the Operations and Checkout Building and the Space Station Processing Facility (SSPF) for final assembly and processing for launch.

The Russian modules, including Zarya and Zvezda, were manufactured at the Khrunichev State Research and Production Space Center in Moscow. Zvezda was initially manufactured in 1985 as a component for Mir-2, but was never launched and instead became the ISS Service Module.

The European Space Agency (ESA) Columbus module was manufactured at the EADS Astrium Space Transportation facilities in Bremen, Germany, along with many other contractors throughout Europe. The other ESA-built modulesHarmony, Tranquility, the Leonardo MPLM, and the Cupolawere initially manufactured at the Thales Alenia Space factory in Turin, Italy. The structural steel hulls of the modules were transported by aircraft to the Kennedy Space Center SSPF for launch processing.

The Japanese Experiment Module Kibō, was fabricated in various technology manufacturing facilities in Japan, at the NASDA (now JAXA) Tsukuba Space Center, and the Institute of Space and Astronautical Science. The Kibo module was transported by ship and flown by aircraft to the SSPF.

The Mobile Servicing System, consisting of the Canadarm2 and the Dextre grapple fixture, was manufactured at various factories in Canada (such as the David Florida Laboratory) and the United States, under contract by the Canadian Space Agency. The mobile base system, a connecting framework for Canadarm2 mounted on rails, was built by Northrop Grumman.

Assembly

The assembly of the International Space Station, a major endeavour in space architecture, began in November 1998. Russian modules launched and docked robotically, with the exception of Rassvet. All other modules were delivered by the Space Shuttle, which required installation by ISS and Shuttle crewmembers using the Canadarm2 (SSRMS) and extra-vehicular activities (EVAs); by 5 June 2011, they had added 159 components during more than 1,000 hours of EVA. 127 of these spacewalks originated from the station, and the remaining 32 were launched from the airlocks of docked Space Shuttles. The beta angle of the station had to be considered at all times during construction.

The first module of the ISS, Zarya, was launched on 20 November 1998 on an autonomous Russian Proton rocket. It provided propulsion, attitude control, communications, and electrical power, but lacked long-term life support functions. A passive NASA module, Unity, was launched two weeks later aboard Space Shuttle flight STS-88 and attached to Zarya by astronauts during EVAs. The Unity module has two Pressurised Mating Adapters (PMAs): one connects permanently to Zarya and the other allowed the Space Shuttle to dock to the space station. At that time, the Russian (Soviet) station Mir was still inhabited, and the ISS remained uncrewed for two years. On 12 July 2000, the Zvezda module was launched into orbit. Onboard preprogrammed commands deployed its solar arrays and communications antenna. Zvezda then became the passive target for a rendezvous with Zarya and Unity, maintaining a station-keeping orbit while the Zarya–Unity vehicle performed the rendezvous and docking via ground control and the Russian automated rendezvous and docking system. Zarya computer transferred control of the station to Zvezda computer soon after docking. Zvezda added sleeping quarters, a toilet, kitchen, CO2 scrubbers, dehumidifier, oxygen generators, and exercise equipment, plus data, voice and television communications with mission control, enabling permanent habitation of the station.

The first resident crew, Expedition 1, arrived in November 2000 on Soyuz TM-31. At the end of the first day on the station, astronaut Bill Shepherd requested the use of the radio call sign "Alpha", which he and cosmonaut Sergei Krikalev preferred to the more cumbersome "International Space Station". The name "Alpha" had previously been used for the station in the early 1990s, and its use was authorised for the whole of Expedition 1. Shepherd had been advocating the use of a new name to project managers for some time. Referencing a naval tradition in a pre-launch news conference he had said: "For thousands of years, humans have been going to sea in ships. People have designed and built these vessels, launched them with a good feeling that a name will bring good fortune to the crew and success to their voyage." Yuri Semenov, the President of Russian Space Corporation Energia at the time, disapproved of the name "Alpha" as he felt that Mir was the first modular space station, so the names "Beta" or "Mir 2" for the ISS would have been more fitting.

Expedition 1 arrived midway between the Space Shuttle flights of missions STS-92 and STS-97. These two flights each added segments of the station's Integrated Truss Structure, which provided the station with Ku-band communication for US television, additional attitude support needed for the additional mass of the USOS, and substantial solar arrays to supplement the station's four existing arrays. Over the next two years, the station continued to expand. A Soyuz-U rocket delivered the Pirs docking compartment. The Space Shuttles Discovery, Atlantis, and Endeavour delivered the Destiny laboratory and Quest airlock, in addition to the station's main robot arm, the Canadarm2, and several more segments of the Integrated Truss Structure.

The expansion schedule was interrupted in 2003 by the Space Shuttle Columbia disaster and a resulting hiatus in flights. The Space Shuttle was grounded until 2005 with STS-114 flown by Discovery. Assembly resumed in 2006 with the arrival of STS-115 with Atlantis, which delivered the station's second set of solar arrays. Several more truss segments and a third set of arrays were delivered on STS-116, STS-117, and STS-118. As a result of the major expansion of the station's power-generating capabilities, more pressurised modules could be accommodated, and the Harmony node and Columbus European laboratory were added. These were soon followed by the first two components of Kibō. In March 2009, STS-119 completed the Integrated Truss Structure with the installation of the fourth and final set of solar arrays. The final section of Kibō was delivered in July 2009 on STS-127, followed by the Russian Poisk module. The third node, Tranquility, was delivered in February 2010 during STS-130 by the Space Shuttle Endeavour, alongside the Cupola, followed by the penultimate Russian module, Rassvet, in May 2010. Rassvet was delivered by Space Shuttle Atlantis on STS-132 in exchange for the Russian Proton delivery of the US-funded Zarya module in 1998. The last pressurised module of the USOS, Leonardo, was brought to the station in February 2011 on the final flight of Discovery, STS-133. The Alpha Magnetic Spectrometer was delivered by Endeavour on STS-134 the same year.

By June 2011, the station consisted of 15 pressurised modules and the Integrated Truss Structure. Two power modules called NEM-1 and NEM-2. are still to be launched. Russia's new primary research module Nauka docked in July 2021, along with the European Robotic Arm which will be able to relocate itself to different parts of the Russian modules of the station. Russia's latest addition, the nodal module Prichal, docked in November 2021.

The gross mass of the station changes over time. The mass of experiments, spare parts, personal effects, crew, foodstuff, clothing, propellants, water supplies, gas supplies, docked spacecraft, and other items add to the total mass of the station. Hydrogen gas is constantly vented overboard by the oxygen generators.

Structure

The ISS is a modular space station. Modular stations can allow modules to be added to or removed from the existing structure, allowing greater flexibility.

Below is a diagram of major station components. The blue areas are pressurised sections accessible by the crew without using spacesuits. The station's unpressurised superstructure is indicated in red. Planned components are shown in white, non installed, temporarily defunct or non-commissioned components are shown in brown and former ones in gray. Other unpressurised components are yellow. The Unity node joins directly to the Destiny laboratory. For clarity, they are shown apart. Similar cases are also seen in other parts of the structure.

Pressurised modules

Zarya

The FGB provided electrical power, storage, propulsion, and guidance to the ISS during the initial stage of assembly. With the launch and assembly in orbit of other modules with more specialized functionality, Zarya, as of August 2021, is primarily used for storage, both inside the pressurized section and in the externally mounted fuel tanks. The Zarya is a descendant of the TKS spacecraft designed for the Russian Salyut program. The name Zarya ("Dawn") was given to the FGB because it signified the dawn of a new era of international cooperation in space. Although it was built by a Russian company, it is owned by the United States.

Unity

The Unity connecting module, also known as Node 1, is the first U.S.-built component of the ISS. It connects the Russian and U.S. segments of the station, and is where crew eat meals together.

The module is cylindrical in shape, with six berthing locations (forward, aft, port, starboard, zenith, and nadir) facilitating connections to other modules. Unity is the first of the three connecting modules; the other two are Harmony and Tranquility.

Zvezda

Zvezda (meaning "star"), Salyut DOS-8, is also known as the Zvezda Service Module. It was the third module launched to the station, and provides all of the station's life support systems, some of which are supplemented in the USOS, as well as living quarters for two crew members. It is the structural and functional center of the Russian Orbital Segment, which is the Russian part of the ISS. Crew assemble here to deal with emergencies on the station.

The module was manufactured by RKK Energia, with major sub-contracting work by GKNPTs Khrunichev. Zvezda was launched on a Proton rocket on 12 July 2000, and docked with the Zarya module on 26 July 2000.

Destiny

The Destiny module, also known as the U.S. Lab, is the primary operating facility for U.S. research payloads aboard the ISS. It was berthed to the Unity module and activated over a period of five days in February 2001. Destiny is NASA's first permanent operating orbital research station since Skylab was vacated in February 1974. The Boeing Company began construction of the  research laboratory in 1995 at the Michoud Assembly Facility and then the Marshall Space Flight Center in Huntsville, Alabama. Destiny was shipped to the Kennedy Space Center in Florida in 1998, and was turned over to NASA for pre-launch preparations in August 2000. It launched on 7 February 2001, aboard the Space Shuttle Atlantis on STS-98. Astronauts work inside the pressurized facility to conduct research in numerous scientific fields. Scientists throughout the world would use the results to enhance their studies in medicine, engineering, biotechnology, physics, materials science, and Earth science.

Quest

The Joint Airlock (also known as "Quest") is provided by the U.S. and provides the capability for ISS-based Extravehicular Activity (EVA) using either a U.S. Extravehicular Mobility Unit (EMU) or Russian Orlan EVA suits. Before the launch of this airlock, EVAs were performed from either the U.S. Space Shuttle (while docked) or from the Transfer Chamber on the Service Module. Due to a variety of system and design differences, only U.S. space suits could be used from the Shuttle and only Russian suits could be used from the Service Module. The Joint Airlock alleviates this short-term problem by allowing either (or both) spacesuit systems to be used.
The Joint Airlock was launched on ISS-7A / STS-104 in July 2001 and was attached to the right hand docking port of Node 1. The Joint Airlock is 20 ft. long, 13 ft. in diameter, and weighs 6.5 tons. The Joint Airlock was built by Boeing at Marshall Space Flight Center. The Joint Airlock was launched with the High Pressure Gas Assembly. The High Pressure Gas Assembly was mounted on the external surface of the Joint Airlock and will support EVAs operations with breathing gases and augments the Service Module's gas resupply system.
The Joint Airlock has two main components: a crew airlock from which astronauts and cosmonauts exit the ISS and an equipment airlock designed for storing EVA gear and for so-called overnight "campouts" wherein Nitrogen is purged from astronaut's bodies overnight as pressure is dropped in preparation for spacewalks the following day. This alleviates the bends as the astronauts are repressurized after their EVA.

The crew airlock was derived from the Space Shuttle's external airlock. It is equipped with lighting, external handrails, and an Umbilical Interface Assembly (UIA). The UIA is located on one wall of the crew airlock and provides a water supply line, a wastewater return line, and an oxygen supply line. The UIA also provides communication gear and spacesuit power interfaces and can support two spacesuits simultaneously. This can be either two American EMU spacesuits, two Russian ORLAN spacesuits, or one of each design.

Poisk

Poisk was launched on 10 November 2009 attached to a modified Progress spacecraft, called Progress M-MIM2, on a Soyuz-U rocket from Launch Pad 1 at the Baikonur Cosmodrome in Kazakhstan. Poisk is used as the Russian airlock module, containing two identical EVA hatches. An outward-opening hatch on the Mir space station failed after it swung open too fast after unlatching, because of a small amount of air pressure remaining in the airlock. All EVA hatches on the ISS open inwards and are pressure-sealing. Poisk is used to store, service, and refurbish Russian Orlan suits and provides contingency entry for crew using the slightly bulkier American suits. The outermost docking port on the module allows docking of Soyuz and Progress spacecraft, and the automatic transfer of propellants to and from storage on the ROS. Since the departure of the identical Pirs module on July 26, 2021, Poisk has served as the only airlock on the ROS.

Harmony

Harmony, also known as Node 2, is the "utility hub" of the ISS. It connects the laboratory modules of the United States, Europe and Japan, as well as providing electrical power and electronic data. Sleeping cabins for four of the crew are housed here.

Harmony was successfully launched into space aboard Space Shuttle flight STS-120 on 23 October 2007. After temporarily being attached to the port side of the Unity node, it was moved to its permanent location on the forward end of the Destiny laboratory on 14 November 2007. Its successful installation meant that from NASA's perspective, the station was considered to be "U.S. Core Complete".

Tranquility

Tranquility, also known as Node 3, is a module of the ISS. It contains environmental control systems, life support systems, a toilet, exercise equipment, and an observation cupola.

The European Space Agency and the Italian Space Agency had Tranquility manufactured by Thales Alenia Space. A ceremony on 20 November 2009 transferred ownership of the module to NASA. On 8 February 2010, NASA launched the module on the Space Shuttle's STS-130 mission.

Columbus

Columbus is a science laboratory that is part of the ISS and is the largest single contribution to the station made by the European Space Agency.

Like the Harmony and Tranquility modules, the Columbus laboratory was constructed in Turin, Italy by Thales Alenia Space. The functional equipment and software of the lab was designed by EADS in Bremen, Germany. It was also integrated in Bremen before being flown to the Kennedy Space Center in Florida in an Airbus Beluga. It was launched aboard Space Shuttle Atlantis on 7 February 2008, on flight STS-122. It is designed for ten years of operation. The module is controlled by the Columbus Control Centre, located at the German Space Operations Center, part of the German Aerospace Center in Oberpfaffenhofen near Munich, Germany.

The European Space Agency has spent €1.4 billion (about US$2 billion) on building Columbus, including the experiments it carries and the ground control infrastructure necessary to operate them.

Kibō

The Japanese Experiment Module (JEM), nicknamed , is a Japanese science module for the International Space Station (ISS) developed by JAXA. It is the largest single ISS module, and is attached to the Harmony module. The first two pieces of the module were launched on Space Shuttle missions STS-123 and STS-124. The third and final components were launched on STS-127.

Cupola

The Cupola is an ESA-built observatory module of the ISS. Its name derives from the Italian word , which means "dome". Its seven windows are used to conduct experiments, dockings and observations of Earth. It was launched aboard Space Shuttle mission STS-130 on 8 February 2010 and attached to the Tranquility (Node 3) module. With the Cupola attached, ISS assembly reached 85 percent completion.

Rassvet

Rassvet (lit. "dawn"), also known as the Mini-Research Module 1 (MRM-1) and formerly known as the Docking Cargo Module (DCM), is a component of the International Space Station (ISS). The module's design is similar to the Mir Docking Module launched on STS-74 in 1995. Rassvet is primarily used for cargo storage and as a docking port for visiting spacecraft. It was flown to the ISS aboard Space Shuttle Atlantis on the STS-132 mission on 14 May 2010, and was connected to the ISS on 18 May 2010. The hatch connecting Rassvet with the ISS was first opened on 20 May 2010. On 28 June 2010, the Soyuz TMA-19 spacecraft performed the first docking with the module.

MLM outfittings

In May 2010, equipment for Nauka was launched on STS-132 (as part of an agreement with NASA) and delivered by Space Shuttle Atlantis. Weighing 1.4 metric tons, the equipment was attached to the outside of Rassvet (MRM-1). It included a spare elbow joint for the European Robotic Arm (ERA) (which was launched with Nauka) and an ERA-portable workpost used during EVAs, as well as RTOd heat radiator, internal hardware and an experiment airlock for launching CubeSats to be positioned on the modified passive forward port near the nadir end of the Nauka module.

The RTOd radiator will be used to add additional cooling capability to Nauka, which will enable the module to host more scientific experiments. The airlock will be used only to pass experiments inside and outside the module, with the aid of ERAvery similar to the Japanese airlock and Nanoracks Bishop Airlock on the U.S. segment of the station.

The ERA will be used to remove the RTOd radiator and airlock from Rassvet and transfer them over to Nauka. This process is expected to take several months. A portable work platform will also be transferred over, which can attach to the end of the ERA to allow cosmonauts to "ride" on the end of the arm during spacewalks.

Another MLM outfitting is a 4 segment external payload interface called means of attachment of large payloads (Sredstva Krepleniya Krupnogabaritnykh Obyektov, SKKO). Delivered in two parts to Nauka by Progress MS-18 (LCCS part) and Progress MS-21 (SCCCS part) as part of the module activation outfitting process. It was taken outside and installed on the ERA aft facing base point on Nauka during the VKD-55 spacewalk.

Leonardo

The Leonardo Permanent Multipurpose Module (PMM) is a module of the International Space Station. It was flown into space aboard the Space Shuttle on STS-133 on 24 February 2011 and installed on 1 March. Leonardo is primarily used for storage of spares, supplies and waste on the ISS, which was until then stored in many different places within the space station. It is also the personal hygiene area for the astronauts who live in the US Orbital Segment. The Leonardo PMM was a Multi-Purpose Logistics Module (MPLM) before 2011, but was modified into its current configuration. It was formerly one of two MPLM used for bringing cargo to and from the ISS with the Space Shuttle. The module was named for Italian polymath Leonardo da Vinci.

Bigelow Expandable Activity Module

The Bigelow Expandable Activity Module (BEAM) is an experimental expandable space station module developed by Bigelow Aerospace, under contract to NASA, for testing as a temporary module on the International Space Station (ISS) from 2016 to at least 2020. It arrived at the ISS on 10 April 2016, was berthed to the station on 16 April at Tranquility Node 3, and was expanded and pressurized on 28 May 2016.

International Docking Adapters
The International Docking Adapter (IDA) is a spacecraft docking system adapter developed to convert APAS-95 to the NASA Docking System (NDS). An IDA is placed on each of the ISS's two open Pressurized Mating Adapters (PMAs), both of which are connected to the Harmony module.

Two International Docking Adapters are currently installed aboard the Station. Originally, IDA-1 was planned to be installed on PMA-2, located at Harmony's forward port, and IDA-2 would be installed on PMA-3 at Harmony's zenith. After IDA 1 was destroyed in a launch incident, IDA-2 was installed on PMA-2 on 19 August 2016, while IDA-3 was later installed on PMA-3 on 21 August 2019.

Bishop Airlock Module

The NanoRacks Bishop Airlock Module is a commercially funded airlock module launched to the ISS on SpaceX CRS-21 on 6 December 2020. The module was built by NanoRacks, Thales Alenia Space, and Boeing. It will be used to deploy CubeSats, small satellites, and other external payloads for NASA, CASIS, and other commercial and governmental customers.

Nauka

Nauka, also known as the Multipurpose Laboratory Module-Upgrade (MLM-U), (Russian: Многоцелевой лабораторный модуль, усоверше́нствованный, or МЛМ-У), is a Roscosmos-funded component of the ISS that was launched on 21 July 2021, 14:58 UTC. In the original ISS plans, Nauka was to use the location of the Docking and Stowage Module (DSM), but the DSM was later replaced by the Rassvet module and moved to Zaryas nadir port. Nauka was successfully docked to Zvezdas nadir port on 29 July 2021, 13:29 UTC, replacing the Pirs module.

It had a temporary docking adapter on its nadir port for crewed and uncrewed missions until Prichal arrival, where just before its arrival it was removed by a departuring Progress spacecraft.

Prichal

Prichal, also known as Uzlovoy Module or UM, is a  ball-shaped module that will provide the Russian segment additional docking ports to receive Soyuz MS and Progress MS spacecraft. UM was launched in November 2021. It was integrated with a special version of the Progress cargo spacecraft and launched by a standard Soyuz rocket, docking to the nadir port of the Nauka module. One port is equipped with an active hybrid docking port, which enables docking with the MLM module. The remaining five ports are passive hybrids, enabling docking of Soyuz and Progress vehicles, as well as heavier modules and future spacecraft with modified docking systems. The node module was intended to serve as the only permanent element of the cancelled Orbital Piloted Assembly and Experiment Complex (OPSEK).

Unpressurised elements

The ISS has a large number of external components that do not require pressurisation. The largest of these is the Integrated Truss Structure (ITS), to which the station's main solar arrays and thermal radiators are mounted.

The station was intended to have several smaller external components, such as six robotic arms, three External Stowage Platforms (ESPs) and four ExPRESS Logistics Carriers (ELCs). While these platforms allow experiments (including MISSE, the STP-H3 and the Robotic Refueling Mission) to be deployed and conducted in the vacuum of space by providing electricity and processing experimental data locally, their primary function is to store spare Orbital Replacement Units (ORUs). ORUs are parts that can be replaced when they fail or pass their design life, including pumps, storage tanks, antennas, and battery units. Such units are replaced either by astronauts during EVA or by robotic arms. Several shuttle missions were dedicated to the delivery of ORUs, including STS-129, STS-133 and STS-134. , only one other mode of transportation of ORUs had been utilisedthe Japanese cargo vessel HTV-2which delivered an FHRC and CTC-2 via its Exposed Pallet (EP).

There are also smaller exposure facilities mounted directly to laboratory modules; the Kibō Exposed Facility serves as an external "porch" for the Kibō complex, and a facility on the European Columbus laboratory provides power and data connections for experiments such as the European Technology Exposure Facility and the Atomic Clock Ensemble in Space. A remote sensing instrument, SAGE III-ISS, was delivered to the station in February 2017 aboard CRS-10, and the NICER experiment was delivered aboard CRS-11 in June 2017. The largest scientific payload externally mounted to the ISS is the Alpha Magnetic Spectrometer (AMS), a particle physics experiment launched on STS-134 in May 2011, and mounted externally on the ITS. The AMS measures cosmic rays to look for evidence of dark matter and antimatter.

The commercial Bartolomeo External Payload Hosting Platform, manufactured by Airbus, was launched on 6 March 2020 aboard CRS-20 and attached to the European Columbus module. It will provide an additional 12 external payload slots, supplementing the eight on the ExPRESS Logistics Carriers, ten on Kibō, and four on Columbus. The system is designed to be robotically serviced and will require no astronaut intervention. It is named after Christopher Columbus's younger brother.

Robotic arms and cargo cranes

The Integrated Truss Structure serves as a base for the station's primary remote manipulator system, the Mobile Servicing System (MSS), which is composed of three main components:
 Dextre is a  robotic manipulator that has two arms and a rotating torso, with power tools, lights, and video for replacing orbital replacement units (ORUs) and performing other tasks requiring fine control.
 The Mobile Base System (MBS) is a platform that rides on rails along the length of the station's main truss, which serves as a mobile base for Canadarm2 and Dextre, allowing the robotic arms to reach all parts of the USOS.

A grapple fixture was added to Zarya on STS-134 to enable Canadarm2 to inchworm itself onto the Russian Orbital Segment. Also installed during STS-134 was the  Orbiter Boom Sensor System (OBSS), which had been used to inspect heat shield tiles on Space Shuttle missions and which can be used on the station to increase the reach of the MSS. Staff on Earth or the ISS can operate the MSS components using remote control, performing work outside the station without the need for space walks.

Japan's Remote Manipulator System, which services the Kibō Exposed Facility, was launched on STS-124 and is attached to the Kibō Pressurised Module. The arm is similar to the Space Shuttle arm as it is permanently attached at one end and has a latching end effector for standard grapple fixtures at the other.

The European Robotic Arm, which will service the Russian Orbital Segment, was launched alongside the Nauka module. The ROS does not require spacecraft or modules to be manipulated, as all spacecraft and modules dock automatically and may be discarded the same way. Crew use the two Strela cargo cranes during EVAs for moving crew and equipment around the ROS.

Former module

Pirs 

Pirs (Russian: Пирс, lit. 'Pier') was launched on 14 September 2001, as ISS Assembly Mission 4R, on a Russian Soyuz-U rocket, using a modified Progress spacecraft, Progress M-SO1, as an upper stage.  Pirs was undocked by Progress MS-16 on 26 July 2021, 10:56 UTC, and deorbited on the same day at 14:51 UTC to make room for Nauka module to be attached to the space station. Prior to its departure, Pirs served as the primary Russian airlock on the station, being used to store and refurbish the Russian Orlan spacesuits.

Planned components

Axiom segment 

In January 2020, NASA awarded Axiom Space a contract to build a commercial module for the ISS with a launch date of 2024. The contract is under the NextSTEP2 program. NASA negotiated with Axiom on a firm fixed-price contract basis to build and deliver the module, which will attach to the forward port of the space station's Harmony (Node 2) module. Although NASA has only commissioned one module, Axiom plans to build an entire segment consisting of five modules, including a node module, an orbital research and manufacturing facility, a crew habitat, and a "large-windowed Earth observatory". The Axiom segment is expected to greatly increase the capabilities and value of the space station, allowing for larger crews and private spaceflight by other organisations. Axiom plans to convert the segment into a stand-alone space station once the ISS is decommissioned, with the intention that this would act as a successor to the ISS. Canadarm 2 will also help to berth the Axiom Space Station modules to the ISS and will continue its operations on the Axiom Space Station after the retirement of ISS in late 2020s.

Proposed components

Xbase

Made by Bigelow Aerospace. In August 2016 Bigelow negotiated an agreement with NASA to develop a full-sized ground prototype Deep Space Habitation based on the B330 under the second phase of Next Space Technologies for Exploration Partnerships. The module is called the Expandable Bigelow Advanced Station Enhancement (XBASE), as Bigelow hopes to test the module by attaching it to the International Space Station.

Independence-1
Nanoracks, after finalizing its contract with NASA, and after winning NextSTEPs Phase II award, is now developing its concept Independence-1 (previously known as Ixion), which would turn spent rocket tanks into a habitable living area to be tested in space. In Spring 2018, Nanoracks announced that Ixion is now known as the Independence-1, the first 'outpost' in Nanoracks' Space Outpost Program.

Nautilus-X Centrifuge Demonstration

If produced, this centrifuge will be the first in-space demonstration of sufficient scale centrifuge for artificial partial-g effects. It will be designed to become a sleep module for the ISS crew.

Cancelled components

Several modules planned for the station were cancelled over the course of the ISS programme. Reasons include budgetary constraints, the modules becoming unnecessary, and station redesigns after the 2003 Columbia disaster. The US Centrifuge Accommodations Module would have hosted science experiments in varying levels of artificial gravity. The US Habitation Module would have served as the station's living quarters. Instead, the living quarters are now spread throughout the station. The US Interim Control Module and ISS Propulsion Module would have replaced the functions of Zvezda in case of a launch failure. Two Russian Research Modules were planned for scientific research. They would have docked to a Russian Universal Docking Module. The Russian Science Power Platform would have supplied power to the Russian Orbital Segment independent of the ITS solar arrays.

Science Power Modules 1 and 2 (Repurposed Components)
Science Power Module 1 (SPM-1, also known as NEM-1) and Science Power Module 2 (SPM-2, also known as NEM-2) are modules that were originally planned to arrive at the ISS no earlier than 2024, and dock to the Prichal module, which is currently docked to the Nauka module. In April 2021, Roscosmos announced that NEM-1 would be repurposed to function as the core module of the proposed Russian Orbital Service Station (ROSS), launching no earlier than 2027 and docking to the free-flying Nauka module either before or after the ISS has been deorbited. NEM-2 may be converted into another core "base" module, which would be launched in 2028.

Onboard systems

Life support

The critical systems are the atmosphere control system, the water supply system, the food supply facilities, the sanitation and hygiene equipment, and fire detection and suppression equipment. The Russian Orbital Segment's life support systems are contained in the Zvezda service module. Some of these systems are supplemented by equipment in the USOS. The Nauka laboratory has a complete set of life support systems.

Atmospheric control systems

The atmosphere on board the ISS is similar to that of Earth. An Earth-like atmosphere offers benefits for crew comfort, and is much safer than a pure oxygen atmosphere, because of the increased risk of a fire such as that responsible for the deaths of the Apollo 1 crew.
Earth-like atmospheric conditions have been maintained on all Russian and Soviet spacecraft.

The Elektron system aboard Zvezda and a similar system in Destiny generate oxygen aboard the station. The crew has a backup option in the form of bottled oxygen and Solid Fuel Oxygen Generation (SFOG) canisters, a chemical oxygen generator system. Carbon dioxide is removed from the air by the Vozdukh system in Zvezda. Other by-products of human metabolism, such as methane from the intestines and ammonia from sweat, are removed by activated charcoal filters.

Part of the ROS atmosphere control system is the oxygen supply. Triple-redundancy is provided by the Elektron unit, solid fuel generators, and stored oxygen. The  system uses approximately one litre of water per crew member per day. This water is either brought from Earth or recycled from other systems. Mir was the first spacecraft to use recycled water for oxygen production. The secondary oxygen supply is provided by burning oxygen-producing Vika cartridges (see also ISS ECLSS). This unit is manually operated.

The US Orbital Segment has redundant supplies of oxygen, from a pressurised storage tank on the Quest airlock module delivered in 2001, supplemented ten years later by ESA-built Advanced Closed-Loop System (ACLS) in the Tranquility module (Node 3), which produces  by electrolysis. Hydrogen produced is combined with carbon dioxide from the cabin atmosphere and converted to water and methane.

Power and thermal control

Double-sided solar arrays provide electrical power to the ISS. These bifacial cells collect direct sunlight on one side and light reflected off from the Earth on the other, and are more efficient and operate at a lower temperature than single-sided cells commonly used on Earth. 

The Russian segment of the station, like most spacecraft, uses 28 V low voltage DC from two rotating solar arrays mounted on Zvezda. The USOS uses 130–180 V DC from the USOS PV array, power is stabilised and distributed at 160 V DC and converted to the user-required 124 V DC. The higher distribution voltage allows smaller, lighter conductors, at the expense of crew safety. The two station segments share power with converters.

The USOS solar arrays are arranged as four wing pairs, for a total production of 75 to 90 kilowatts. These arrays normally track the Sun to maximise power generation. In the complete configuration, the solar arrays track the Sun by rotating the alpha gimbal once per orbit; the beta gimbal follows slower changes in the angle of the Sun to the orbital plane. The Night Glider mode aligns the solar arrays parallel to the ground at night to reduce the significant aerodynamic drag at the station's relatively low orbital altitude.

The station originally used rechargeable nickel–hydrogen batteries for continuous power during the 45 minutes of every 90-minute orbit that it is eclipsed by the Earth. The batteries are recharged on the day side of the orbit. They had a 6.5-year lifetime (over 37,000 charge/discharge cycles) and were regularly replaced over the anticipated 20-year life of the station. Starting in 2016, the nickel–hydrogen batteries were replaced by lithium-ion batteries, which are expected to last until the end of the ISS program.

The station's large solar panels generate a high potential voltage difference between the station and the ionosphere. This could cause arcing through insulating surfaces and sputtering of conductive surfaces as ions are accelerated by the spacecraft plasma sheath. To mitigate this, plasma contactor units create current paths between the station and the ambient space plasma.

The station's systems and experiments consume a large amount of electrical power, almost all of which is converted to heat. To keep the internal temperature within workable limits, a passive thermal control system (PTCS) is made of external surface materials, insulation such as MLI, and heat pipes. If the PTCS cannot keep up with the heat load, an External Active Thermal Control System (EATCS) maintains the temperature. The EATCS consists of an internal, non-toxic, water coolant loop used to cool and dehumidify the atmosphere, which transfers collected heat into an external liquid ammonia loop. From the heat exchangers, ammonia is pumped into external radiators that emit heat as infrared radiation, then back to the station. The EATCS provides cooling for all the US pressurised modules, including Kibō and Columbus, as well as the main power distribution electronics of the S0, S1 and P1 trusses. It can reject up to 70 kW. This is much more than the 14 kW of the Early External Active Thermal Control System (EEATCS) via the Early Ammonia Servicer (EAS), which was launched on STS-105 and installed onto the P6 Truss.

Communications and computers

Radio communications provide telemetry and scientific data links between the station and mission control centres. Radio links are also used during rendezvous and docking procedures and for audio and video communication between crew members, flight controllers and family members. As a result, the ISS is equipped with internal and external communication systems used for different purposes.

The Russian Orbital Segment communicates directly with the ground via the Lira antenna mounted to Zvezda. The Lira antenna also has the capability to use the Luch data relay satellite system. This system fell into disrepair during the 1990s, and so was not used during the early years of the ISS, although two new Luch satellitesLuch-5A and Luch-5Bwere launched in 2011 and 2012 respectively to restore the operational capability of the system. Another Russian communications system is the Voskhod-M, which enables internal telephone communications between Zvezda, Zarya, Pirs, Poisk, and the USOS and provides a VHF radio link to ground control centres via antennas on Zvezda exterior.

The US Orbital Segment (USOS) makes use of two separate radio links: S band (audio, telemetry, commanding – located on the P1/S1 truss) and Ku band (audio, video and data – located on the Z1 truss) systems. These transmissions are routed via the United States Tracking and Data Relay Satellite System (TDRSS) in geostationary orbit, allowing for almost continuous real-time communications with Christopher C. Kraft Jr. Mission Control Center (MCC-H) in Houston. Data channels for the Canadarm2, European Columbus laboratory and Japanese Kibō modules were originally also routed via the S band and Ku band systems, with the European Data Relay System and a similar Japanese system intended to eventually complement the TDRSS in this role. Communications between modules are carried on an internal wireless network.

UHF radio is used by astronauts and cosmonauts conducting EVAs and other spacecraft that dock to or undock from the station. Automated spacecraft are fitted with their own communications equipment; the ATV uses a laser attached to the spacecraft and the Proximity Communications Equipment attached to Zvezda to accurately dock with the station.

The ISS is equipped with about 100 IBM/Lenovo ThinkPad and HP ZBook 15 laptop computers. The laptops have run Windows 95, Windows 2000, Windows XP, Windows 7, Windows 10 and Linux operating systems. Each computer is a commercial off-the-shelf purchase which is then modified for safety and operation including updates to connectors, cooling and power to accommodate the station's 28V DC power system and weightless environment. Heat generated by the laptops does not rise but stagnates around the laptop, so additional forced ventilation is required. Portable Computer System (PCS) laptops connect to the Primary Command & Control computer (C&C MDM) as remote terminals via a USB to 1553 adapter. Station Support Computer (SSC) laptops aboard the ISS are connected to the station's wireless LAN via Wi-Fi and ethernet, which connects to the ground via Ku band. While originally this provided speeds of 10 Mbit/s download and 3 Mbit/s upload from the station, NASA upgraded the system in late August 2019 and increased the speeds to 600 Mbit/s. Laptop hard drives occasionally fail and must be replaced. Other computer hardware failures include instances in 2001, 2007 and 2017; some of these failures have required EVAs to replace computer modules in externally mounted devices.

The operating system used for key station functions is the Debian Linux distribution. The migration from Microsoft Windows to Linux was made in May 2013 for reasons of reliability, stability and flexibility.

In 2017, an SG100 Cloud Computer was launched to the ISS as part of OA-7 mission. It was manufactured by NCSIST of Taiwan and designed in collaboration with Academia Sinica, and National Central University under contract for NASA.

ISS crew members have access to the Internet, and thus the web. This was first enabled in 2010, allowing NASA astronaut T.J. Creamer to make the first tweet from space. Access is achieved via an Internet-enabled computer in Houston, using remote desktop mode, thereby protecting the ISS from virus infection and hacking attempts.

Operations

Expeditions

Each permanent crew is given an expedition number. Expeditions run up to six months, from launch until undocking, an 'increment' covers the same time period, but includes cargo spacecraft and all activities. Expeditions 1 to 6 consisted of three-person crews. Expeditions 7 to 12 were reduced to the safe minimum of two following the destruction of the NASA Shuttle Columbia. From Expedition 13 the crew gradually increased to six around 2010. With the arrival of crew on US commercial vehicles beginning in 2020, NASA has indicated that expedition size may be increased to seven crew members, the number ISS was originally designed for.

Gennady Padalka, member of Expeditions 9, 19/20, 31/32, and 43/44, and Commander of Expedition 11, has spent more time in space than anyone else, a total of 878 days, 11 hours, and 29 minutes. Peggy Whitson has spent the most time in space of any American, totalling 665 days, 22 hours, and 22 minutes during her time on Expeditions 5, 16, and 50/51/52.

Private flights

Travellers who pay for their own passage into space are termed spaceflight participants by Roscosmos and NASA, and are sometimes referred to as "space tourists", a term they generally dislike. , seven space tourists have visited the ISS; all seven were transported to the ISS on Russian Soyuz spacecraft. When professional crews change over in numbers not divisible by the three seats in a Soyuz, and a short-stay crewmember is not sent, the spare seat is sold by MirCorp through Space Adventures. Space tourism was halted in 2011 when the Space Shuttle was retired and the station's crew size was reduced to six, as the partners relied on Russian transport seats for access to the station. Soyuz flight schedules increased after 2013, allowing five Soyuz flights (15 seats) with only two expeditions (12 seats) required. The remaining seats were to be sold for around US$40 million to members of the public who could pass a medical exam. ESA and NASA criticised private spaceflight at the beginning of the ISS, and NASA initially resisted training Dennis Tito, the first person to pay for his own passage to the ISS. 

Anousheh Ansari became the first self-funded woman to fly to the ISS as well as the first Iranian in space. Officials reported that her education and experience made her much more than a tourist, and her performance in training had been "excellent." She did Russian and European studies involving medicine and microbiology during her 10-day stay. The 2009 documentary Space Tourists follows her journey to the station, where she fulfilled "an age-old dream of man: to leave our planet as a 'normal person' and travel into outer space."

In 2008, spaceflight participant Richard Garriott placed a geocache aboard the ISS during his flight. This is currently the only non-terrestrial geocache in existence. At the same time, the Immortality Drive, an electronic record of eight digitised human DNA sequences, was placed aboard the ISS.

Fleet operations 

A wide variety of crewed and uncrewed spacecraft have supported the station's activities. Flights to the ISS include 37 Space Shuttle missions, 83 Progress resupply spacecraft (including the modified M-MIM2, M-SO1 and M-UM module transports), 63 crewed Soyuz spacecraft, 5 European ATVs, 9 Japanese HTVs, 1 Boeing Starliner, 30 SpaceX Dragon ( both crewed and uncrewed) and 18 Cygnus missions.

There are currently twelve available docking ports for visiting spacecraft:

 Harmony forward (with IDA 2)
 Harmony zenith (with IDA 3)
 Harmony nadir
 Unity nadir
 Prichal nadir
 Prichal aft
 Prichal forward
 Prichal starboard
 Prichal port
 Nauka forward
 Poisk zenith
 Rassvet nadir
 Zvezda aft

Crewed 

, 256 people from 20 countries had visited the space station, many of them multiple times. The United States sent 158 people, Russia sent 55, 11 were Japanese, nine were Canadian, five were Italian, four were French, four were German, and there were one each from Belgium, Brazil, Denmark, Great Britain, Kazakhstan, Malaysia, the Netherlands, South Africa, South Korea, Spain, Israel, Sweden and the United Arab Emirates.

Uncrewed 
Uncrewed spaceflights to the ISS are made primarily to deliver cargo, however several Russian modules have also docked to the outpost following uncrewed launches. Resupply missions typically use the Russian Progress spacecraft, former European ATVs, Japanese Kounotori vehicles, and the American Dragon and Cygnus spacecraft. The primary docking system for Progress spacecraft is the automated Kurs system, with the manual TORU system as a backup. ATVs also used Kurs, however they were not equipped with TORU. Progress and former ATV can remain docked for up to six months. The other spacecraftthe Japanese HTV, the SpaceX Dragon (under CRS phase 1), and the Northrop Grumman Cygnusrendezvous with the station before being grappled using Canadarm2 and berthed at the nadir port of the Harmony or Unity module for one to two months. Under CRS phase 2, Cargo Dragon docks autonomously at IDA-2 or IDA-3. , Progress spacecraft have flown most of the uncrewed missions to the ISS.

Soyuz MS-22 was launched in 2022. A micro-meteorite impact in December 2022 caused a coolant leak in its external radiator and it was considered risky for human landing. Thus MS-22 will reenter uncrewed and Soyuz MS-23 will be launched unmanned on 20 February 2023, to return the MS-22 crew.

Currently docked/berthed

Modules/spacecraft pending relocation/installation

Scheduled missions 
 All dates are UTC. Dates are the earliest possible dates and may change.
 Forward ports are at the front of the station according to its normal direction of travel and orientation (attitude). Aft is at the rear of the station, used by spacecraft boosting the station's orbit. Nadir is closest the Earth, zenith is on top. Port is to the left if pointing one's feet towards the Earth and looking in the direction of travel; starboard to the right.

Docking 

All Russian spacecraft and self-propelled modules are able to rendezvous and dock to the space station without human intervention using the Kurs radar docking system from over 200 kilometres away. The European ATV uses star sensors and GPS to determine its intercept course. When it catches up it uses laser equipment to optically recognise Zvezda, along with the Kurs system for redundancy.  Crew supervise these craft, but do not intervene except to send abort commands in emergencies. Progress and ATV supply craft can remain at the ISS for six months, allowing great flexibility in crew time for loading and unloading of supplies and trash.
 
From the initial station programs, the Russians pursued an automated docking methodology that used the crew in override or monitoring roles. Although the initial development costs were high, the system has become very reliable with standardisations that provide significant cost benefits in repetitive operations.
 
Soyuz spacecraft used for crew rotation also serve as lifeboats for emergency evacuation; they are replaced every six months and were used after the Columbia disaster to return stranded crew from the ISS. Soyuz crew rotation flights and Progress resupply flights visit the station on average two and three times respectively each year.
 
Other vehicles berth instead of docking. The Japanese H-II Transfer Vehicle parked itself in progressively closer orbits to the station, and then awaited 'approach' commands from the crew, until it was close enough for a robotic arm to grapple and berth the vehicle to the USOS. Berthed craft can transfer International Standard Payload Racks. Japanese spacecraft berth for one to two months. The berthing Cygnus and SpaceX Dragon were contracted to fly cargo to the station under phase 1 of the Commercial Resupply Services program.
 
From 26 February 2011 to 7 March 2011 four of the governmental partners (United States, ESA, Japan and Russia) had their spacecraft (NASA Shuttle, ATV, HTV, Progress and Soyuz) docked at the ISS, the only time this has happened to date. On 25 May 2012, SpaceX delivered the first commercial cargo with a Dragon spacecraft.

Launch and docking windows 
Prior to a spacecraft's docking to the ISS, navigation and attitude control (GNC) is handed over to the ground control of the spacecraft's country of origin. GNC is set to allow the station to drift in space, rather than fire its thrusters or turn using gyroscopes. The solar panels of the station are turned edge-on to the incoming spacecraft, so residue from its thrusters does not damage the cells. Before its retirement, Shuttle launches were often given priority over Soyuz, with occasional priority given to Soyuz arrivals carrying crew and time-critical cargoes, such as biological experiment materials.

Repairs

Orbital Replacement Units (ORUs) are spare parts that can be readily replaced when a unit either passes its design life or fails. Examples of ORUs are pumps, storage tanks, controller boxes, antennas, and battery units. Some units can be replaced using robotic arms. Most are stored outside the station, either on small pallets called ExPRESS Logistics Carriers (ELCs) or share larger platforms called External Stowage Platforms which also hold science experiments. Both kinds of pallets provide electricity for many parts that could be damaged by the cold of space and require heating. The larger logistics carriers also have local area network (LAN) connections for telemetry to connect experiments. A heavy emphasis on stocking the USOS with ORU's occurred around 2011, before the end of the NASA shuttle programme, as its commercial replacements, Cygnus and Dragon, carry one tenth to one quarter the payload.

Unexpected problems and failures have impacted the station's assembly time-line and work schedules leading to periods of reduced capabilities and, in some cases, could have forced abandonment of the station for safety reasons. Serious problems include an air leak from the USOS in 2004, the venting of fumes from an Elektron oxygen generator in 2006, and the failure of the computers in the ROS in 2007 during STS-117 that left the station without thruster, Elektron, Vozdukh and other environmental control system operations. In the latter case, the root cause was found to be condensation inside electrical connectors leading to a short circuit.

During STS-120 in 2007 and following the relocation of the P6 truss and solar arrays, it was noted during unfurling that the solar array had torn and was not deploying properly. An EVA was carried out by Scott Parazynski, assisted by Douglas Wheelock. Extra precautions were taken to reduce the risk of electric shock, as the repairs were carried out with the solar array exposed to sunlight. The issues with the array were followed in the same year by problems with the starboard Solar Alpha Rotary Joint (SARJ), which rotates the arrays on the starboard side of the station. Excessive vibration and high-current spikes in the array drive motor were noted, resulting in a decision to substantially curtail motion of the starboard SARJ until the cause was understood. Inspections during EVAs on STS-120 and STS-123 showed extensive contamination from metallic shavings and debris in the large drive gear and confirmed damage to the large metallic bearing surfaces, so the joint was locked to prevent further damage. Repairs to the joints were carried out during STS-126 with lubrication and the replacement of 11 out of 12 trundle bearings on the joint.

In September 2008, damage to the S1 radiator was first noticed in Soyuz imagery. The problem was initially not thought to be serious. The imagery showed that the surface of one sub-panel has peeled back from the underlying central structure, possibly because of micro-meteoroid or debris impact. On 15 May 2009 the damaged radiator panel's ammonia tubing was mechanically shut off from the rest of the cooling system by the computer-controlled closure of a valve. The same valve was then used to vent the ammonia from the damaged panel, eliminating the possibility of an ammonia leak. It is also known that a Service Module thruster cover struck the S1 radiator after being jettisoned during an EVA in 2008, but its effect, if any, has not been determined.

In the early hours of 1 August 2010, a failure in cooling Loop A (starboard side), one of two external cooling loops, left the station with only half of its normal cooling capacity and zero redundancy in some systems. The problem appeared to be in the ammonia pump module that circulates the ammonia cooling fluid. Several subsystems, including two of the four CMGs, were shut down.

Planned operations on the ISS were interrupted through a series of EVAs to address the cooling system issue. A first EVA on 7 August 2010, to replace the failed pump module, was not fully completed because of an ammonia leak in one of four quick-disconnects. A second EVA on 11 August successfully removed the failed pump module. A third EVA was required to restore Loop A to normal functionality.

The USOS's cooling system is largely built by the US company Boeing, which is also the manufacturer of the failed pump.

The four Main Bus Switching Units (MBSUs, located in the S0 truss), control the routing of power from the four solar array wings to the rest of the ISS. Each MBSU has two power channels that feed 160V DC from the arrays to two DC-to-DC power converters (DDCUs) that supply the 124V power used in the station. In late 2011 MBSU-1 ceased responding to commands or sending data confirming its health. While still routing power correctly, it was scheduled to be swapped out at the next available EVA. A spare MBSU was already on board, but a 30 August 2012 EVA failed to be completed when a bolt being tightened to finish installation of the spare unit jammed before the electrical connection was secured. The loss of MBSU-1 limited the station to 75% of its normal power capacity, requiring minor limitations in normal operations until the problem could be addressed.

On 5 September 2012, in a second six-hour EVA, astronauts Sunita Williams and Akihiko Hoshide successfully replaced MBSU-1 and restored the ISS to 100% power.

On 24 December 2013, astronauts installed a new ammonia pump for the station's cooling system. The faulty cooling system had failed earlier in the month, halting many of the station's science experiments. Astronauts had to brave a "mini blizzard" of ammonia while installing the new pump. It was only the second Christmas Eve spacewalk in NASA history.

Mission control centres 

The components of the ISS are operated and monitored by their respective space agencies at mission control centres across the globe, including RKA Mission Control Center, ATV Control Centre, JEM Control Center and HTV Control Center at Tsukuba Space Center, Christopher C. Kraft Jr. Mission Control Center, Payload Operations and Integration Center, Columbus Control Center and Mobile Servicing System Control.

Life aboard

Living quarters
The living and working space on the International Space Station is larger than a six-bedroom house (complete with six sleeping quarters, two bathrooms, a gym, and a 360-degree view bay window).

Crew activities

A typical day for the crew begins with a wake-up at 06:00, followed by post-sleep activities and a morning inspection of the station. The crew then eats breakfast and takes part in a daily planning conference with Mission Control before starting work at around 08:10. The first scheduled exercise of the day follows, after which the crew continues work until 13:05. Following a one-hour lunch break, the afternoon consists of more exercise and work before the crew carries out its pre-sleep activities beginning at 19:30, including dinner and a crew conference. The scheduled sleep period begins at 21:30. In general, the crew works ten hours per day on a weekday, and five hours on Saturdays, with the rest of the time their own for relaxation or work catch-up.

The time zone used aboard the ISS is Coordinated Universal Time (UTC). The windows are covered during night hours to give the impression of darkness because the station experiences 16 sunrises and sunsets per day. During visiting Space Shuttle missions, the ISS crew mostly followed the shuttle's Mission Elapsed Time (MET), which was a flexible time zone based on the launch time of the Space Shuttle mission.

The station provides crew quarters for each member of the expedition's crew, with two "sleep stations" in the Zvezda, one in Nauka and four more installed in Harmony. The USOS quarters are private, approximately person-sized soundproof booths. The ROS crew quarters in Zvezda include a small window, but provide less ventilation and sound proofing. A crew member can sleep in a crew quarter in a tethered sleeping bag, listen to music, use a laptop, and store personal items in a large drawer or in nets attached to the module's walls. The module also provides a reading lamp, a shelf and a desktop. Visiting crews have no allocated sleep module, and attach a sleeping bag to an available space on a wall. It is possible to sleep floating freely through the station, but this is generally avoided because of the possibility of bumping into sensitive equipment. It is important that crew accommodations be well ventilated; otherwise, astronauts can wake up oxygen-deprived and gasping for air, because a bubble of their own exhaled carbon dioxide has formed around their heads. During various station activities and crew rest times, the lights in the ISS can be dimmed, switched off, and colour temperatures adjusted.

Food and personal hygiene

On the USOS, most of the food aboard is vacuum sealed in plastic bags; cans are rare because they are heavy and expensive to transport. Preserved food is not highly regarded by the crew and taste is reduced in microgravity, so efforts are taken to make the food more palatable, including using more spices than in regular cooking. The crew looks forward to the arrival of any spacecraft from Earth as they bring fresh fruit and vegetables. Care is taken that foods do not create crumbs, and liquid condiments are preferred over solid to avoid contaminating station equipment. Each crew member has individual food packages and cooks them using the on-board galley. The galley features two food warmers, a refrigerator (added in November 2008), and a water dispenser that provides both heated and unheated water. Drinks are provided as dehydrated powder that is mixed with water before consumption. Drinks and soups are sipped from plastic bags with straws, while solid food is eaten with a knife and fork attached to a tray with magnets to prevent them from floating away. Any food that floats away, including crumbs, must be collected to prevent it from clogging the station's air filters and other equipment.

Showers on space stations were introduced in the early 1970s on Skylab and Salyut 3. By Salyut 6, in the early 1980s, the crew complained of the complexity of showering in space, which was a monthly activity. The ISS does not feature a shower; instead, crewmembers wash using a water jet and wet wipes, with soap dispensed from a toothpaste tube-like container. Crews are also provided with rinseless shampoo and edible toothpaste to save water.

There are two space toilets on the ISS, both of Russian design, located in Zvezda and Tranquility. These Waste and Hygiene Compartments use a fan-driven suction system similar to the Space Shuttle Waste Collection System. Astronauts first fasten themselves to the toilet seat, which is equipped with spring-loaded restraining bars to ensure a good seal. A lever operates a powerful fan and a suction hole slides open: the air stream carries the waste away. Solid waste is collected in individual bags which are stored in an aluminium container. Full containers are transferred to Progress spacecraft for disposal. Liquid waste is evacuated by a hose connected to the front of the toilet, with anatomically correct "urine funnel adapters" attached to the tube so that men and women can use the same toilet. The diverted urine is collected and transferred to the Water Recovery System, where it is recycled into drinking water. In 2021, the arrival of the Nauka module also brought a third toilet to the ISS.

Crew health and safety

Overall
On 12 April 2019, NASA reported medical results from the Astronaut Twin Study. Astronaut Scott Kelly spent a year in space on the ISS, while his twin spent the year on Earth. Several long-lasting changes were observed, including those related to alterations in DNA and cognition, when one twin was compared with the other.

In November 2019, researchers reported that astronauts experienced serious blood flow and clot problems while on board the ISS, based on a six-month study of 11 healthy astronauts. The results may influence long-term spaceflight, including a mission to the planet Mars, according to the researchers.

Radiation

The ISS is partially protected from the space environment by Earth's magnetic field. Solar flares are still a hazard to the crew, who may receive only a few minutes warning. In 2005, during the initial "proton storm" of an X-3 class solar flare, the crew of Expedition 10 took shelter in a more heavily shielded part of the ROS designed for this purpose.

Subatomic charged particles, primarily protons from cosmic rays and solar wind, are normally absorbed by Earth's atmosphere. When they interact in sufficient quantity, their effect is visible to the naked eye in a phenomenon called an aurora. Outside Earth's atmosphere, ISS crews are exposed to approximately one millisievert each day (about a year's worth of natural exposure on Earth), resulting in a higher risk of cancer. Radiation can penetrate living tissue and damage the DNA and chromosomes of lymphocytes; being central to the immune system, any damage to these cells could contribute to the lower immunity experienced by astronauts. Radiation has also been linked to a higher incidence of cataracts in astronauts. Protective shielding and medications may lower the risks to an acceptable level.

Radiation levels on the ISS are between 12 and 28.8 milli rads per day, about five times greater than those experienced by airline passengers and crew, as Earth's electromagnetic field provides almost the same level of protection against solar and other types of radiation in low Earth orbit as in the stratosphere. For example, on a 12-hour flight, an airline passenger would experience 0.1 millisieverts of radiation, or a rate of 0.2 millisieverts per day; this is only one fifth the rate experienced by an astronaut in LEO. Additionally, airline passengers experience this level of radiation for a few hours of flight, while the ISS crew are exposed for their whole stay on board the station.

Stress

There is considerable evidence that psychosocial stressors are among the most important impediments to optimal crew morale and performance. Cosmonaut Valery Ryumin wrote in his journal during a particularly difficult period on board the Salyut 6 space station: "All the conditions necessary for murder are met if you shut two men in a cabin measuring 18 feet by 20 [5.5 m × 6 m] and leave them together for two months."

NASA's interest in psychological stress caused by space travel, initially studied when their crewed missions began, was rekindled when astronauts joined cosmonauts on the Russian space station Mir. Common sources of stress in early US missions included maintaining high performance under public scrutiny and isolation from peers and family. The latter is still often a cause of stress on the ISS, such as when the mother of NASA astronaut Daniel Tani died in a car accident, and when Michael Fincke was forced to miss the birth of his second child.

A study of the longest spaceflight concluded that the first three weeks are a critical period where attention is adversely affected because of the demand to adjust to the extreme change of environment. ISS crew flights typically last about five to six months.

The ISS working environment includes further stress caused by living and working in cramped conditions with people from very different cultures who speak a different language. First-generation space stations had crews who spoke a single language; second- and third-generation stations have crew from many cultures who speak many languages. Astronauts must speak English and Russian, and knowing additional languages is even better.

Due to the lack of gravity, confusion often occurs. Even though there is no up and down in space, some crew members feel like they are oriented upside down. They may also have difficulty measuring distances. This can cause problems like getting lost inside the space station, pulling switches in the wrong direction or misjudging the speed of an approaching vehicle during docking.

Medical

The physiological effects of long-term weightlessness include muscle atrophy, deterioration of the skeleton (osteopenia), fluid redistribution, a slowing of the cardiovascular system, decreased production of red blood cells, balance disorders, and a weakening of the immune system. Lesser symptoms include loss of body mass, and puffiness of the face.

Sleep is regularly disturbed on the ISS because of mission demands, such as incoming or departing spacecraft. Sound levels in the station are unavoidably high. The atmosphere is unable to thermosiphon naturally, so fans are required at all times to process the air which would stagnate in the freefall (zero-G) environment.

To prevent some of the adverse effects on the body, the station is equipped with: two TVIS treadmills (including the COLBERT); the ARED (Advanced Resistive Exercise Device), which enables various weightlifting exercises that add muscle without raising (or compensating for) the astronauts' reduced bone density; and a stationary bicycle. Each astronaut spends at least two hours per day exercising on the equipment. Astronauts use bungee cords to strap themselves to the treadmill.

Microbiological environmental hazards

Hazardous molds that can foul air and water filters may develop aboard space stations. They can produce acids that degrade metal, glass, and rubber. They can also be harmful to the crew's health. Microbiological hazards have led to a development of the LOCAD-PTS which identifies common bacteria and molds faster than standard methods of culturing, which may require a sample to be sent back to Earth. Researchers in 2018 reported, after detecting the presence of five Enterobacter bugandensis bacterial strains on the ISS (none of which are pathogenic to humans), that microorganisms on the ISS should be carefully monitored to continue assuring a medically healthy environment for astronauts.

Contamination on space stations can be prevented by reduced humidity, and by using paint that contains mold-killing chemicals, as well as the use of antiseptic solutions. All materials used in the ISS are tested for resistance against fungi.

In April 2019, NASA reported that a comprehensive study had been conducted into the microorganisms and fungi present on the ISS. The results may be useful in improving the health and safety conditions for astronauts.

Noise
Space flight is not inherently quiet, with noise levels exceeding acoustic standards as far back as the Apollo missions. For this reason, NASA and the International Space Station international partners have developed noise control and hearing loss prevention goals as part of the health program for crew members. Specifically, these goals have been the primary focus of the ISS Multilateral Medical Operations Panel (MMOP) Acoustics Subgroup since the first days of ISS assembly and operations. The effort includes contributions from acoustical engineers, audiologists, industrial hygienists, and physicians who comprise the subgroup's membership from NASA, Roscosmos, the European Space Agency (ESA), the Japanese Aerospace Exploration Agency (JAXA), and the Canadian Space Agency (CSA).

When compared to terrestrial environments, the noise levels incurred by astronauts and cosmonauts on the ISS may seem insignificant and typically occur at levels that would not be of major concern to the Occupational Safety and Health Administration – rarely reaching 85 dBA. But crew members are exposed to these levels 24 hours a day, seven days a week, with current missions averaging six months in duration. These levels of noise also impose risks to crew health and performance in the form of sleep interference and communication, as well as reduced alarm audibility.

Over the 19 plus year history of the ISS, significant efforts have been put forth to limit and reduce noise levels on the ISS. During design and pre-flight activities, members of the Acoustic Subgroup have written acoustic limits and verification requirements, consulted to design and choose quietest available payloads, and then conducted acoustic verification tests prior to launch. During spaceflights, the Acoustics Subgroup has assessed each ISS module's in flight sound levels, produced by a large number of vehicle and science experiment noise sources, to assure compliance with strict acoustic standards. The acoustic environment on ISS changed when additional modules were added during its construction, and as additional spacecraft arrive at the ISS. The Acoustics Subgroup has responded to this dynamic operations schedule by successfully designing and employing acoustic covers, absorptive materials, noise barriers, and vibration isolators to reduce noise levels. Moreover, when pumps, fans, and ventilation systems age and show increased noise levels, this Acoustics Subgroup has guided ISS managers to replace the older, noisier instruments with quiet fan and pump technologies, significantly reducing ambient noise levels.

NASA has adopted most-conservative damage risk criteria (based on recommendations from the National Institute for Occupational Safety and Health and the World Health Organization), in order to protect all crew members. The MMOP Acoustics Subgroup has adjusted its approach to managing noise risks in this unique environment by applying, or modifying, terrestrial approaches for hearing loss prevention to set these conservative limits. One innovative approach has been NASA's Noise Exposure Estimation Tool (NEET), in which noise exposures are calculated in a task-based approach to determine the need for hearing protection devices (HPDs). Guidance for use of HPDs, either mandatory use or recommended, is then documented in the Noise Hazard Inventory, and posted for crew reference during their missions. The Acoustics Subgroup also tracks spacecraft noise exceedances, applies engineering controls, and recommends hearing protective devices to reduce crew noise exposures. Finally, hearing thresholds are monitored on-orbit, during missions.

There have been no persistent mission-related hearing threshold shifts among US Orbital Segment crewmembers (JAXA, CSA, ESA, NASA) during what is approaching 20 years of ISS mission operations, or nearly 175,000 work hours. In 2020, the MMOP Acoustics Subgroup received the Safe-In-Sound Award for Innovation for their combined efforts to mitigate any health effects of noise.

Fire and toxic gases
An onboard fire or a toxic gas leak are other potential hazards. Ammonia is used in the external radiators of the station and could potentially leak into the pressurised modules.

Orbit

Altitude and orbital inclination

This orbit was selected because it is the lowest inclination that can be directly reached by Russian Soyuz and Progress spacecraft launched from Baikonur Cosmodrome at 46° N latitude without overflying China or dropping spent rocket stages in inhabited areas.
The station's altitude was allowed to fall around the time of each NASA shuttle flight to permit heavier loads to be transferred to the station. After the retirement of the shuttle, the nominal orbit of the space station was raised in altitude (from about 350 km to about 400 km). Other, more frequent supply spacecraft do not require this adjustment as they are substantially higher performance vehicles.

Atmospheric drag reduces the altitude by about 2 km a month on average. Orbital boosting can be performed by the station's two main engines on the Zvezda service module, or Russian or European spacecraft docked to Zvezda aft port. The Automated Transfer Vehicle is constructed with the possibility of adding a second docking port to its aft end, allowing other craft to dock and boost the station. It takes approximately two orbits (three hours) for the boost to a higher altitude to be completed. Maintaining ISS altitude uses about 7.5 tonnes of chemical fuel per annum at an annual cost of about $210 million.

The Russian Orbital Segment contains the Data Management System, which handles Guidance, Navigation and Control (ROS GNC) for the entire station. Initially, Zarya, the first module of the station, controlled the station until a short time after the Russian service module Zvezda docked and was transferred control. Zvezda contains the ESA built DMS-R Data Management System. Using two fault-tolerant computers (FTC), Zvezda computes the station's position and orbital trajectory using redundant Earth horizon sensors, Solar horizon sensors as well as Sun and star trackers. The FTCs each contain three identical processing units working in parallel and provide advanced fault-masking by majority voting.

Orientation
Zvezda uses gyroscopes (reaction wheels) and thrusters to turn itself around. Gyroscopes do not require propellant; instead they use electricity to 'store' momentum in flywheels by turning in the opposite direction to the station's movement. The USOS has its own computer-controlled gyroscopes to handle its extra mass. When gyroscopes 'saturate', thrusters are used to cancel out the stored momentum. In February 2005, during Expedition 10, an incorrect command was sent to the station's computer, using about 14 kilograms of propellant before the fault was noticed and fixed. When attitude control computers in the ROS and USOS fail to communicate properly, this can result in a rare 'force fight' where the ROS GNC computer must ignore the USOS counterpart, which itself has no thrusters.

Docked spacecraft can also be used to maintain station attitude, such as for troubleshooting or during the installation of the S3/S4 truss, which provides electrical power and data interfaces for the station's electronics.

Orbital debris threats

The low altitudes at which the ISS orbits are also home to a variety of space debris, including spent rocket stages, defunct satellites, explosion fragments (including materials from anti-satellite weapon tests), paint flakes, slag from solid rocket motors, and coolant released by US-A nuclear-powered satellites. These objects, in addition to natural micrometeoroids, are a significant threat. Objects large enough to destroy the station can be tracked, and are not as dangerous as smaller debris. Objects too small to be detected by optical and radar instruments, from approximately 1 cm down to microscopic size, number in the trillions. Despite their small size, some of these objects are a threat because of their kinetic energy and direction in relation to the station. Spacewalking crew in spacesuits are also at risk of suit damage and consequent exposure to vacuum.

Ballistic panels, also called micrometeorite shielding, are incorporated into the station to protect pressurised sections and critical systems. The type and thickness of these panels depend on their predicted exposure to damage. The station's shields and structure have different designs on the ROS and the USOS. On the USOS, Whipple Shields are used. The US segment modules consist of an inner layer made from  aluminium, a  intermediate layers of Kevlar and Nextel (a ceramic fabric), and an outer layer of stainless steel, which causes objects to shatter into a cloud before hitting the hull, thereby spreading the energy of impact. On the ROS, a carbon fibre reinforced polymer honeycomb screen is spaced from the hull, an aluminium honeycomb screen is spaced from that, with a screen-vacuum thermal insulation covering, and glass cloth over the top.

Space debris is tracked remotely from the ground, and the station crew can be notified. If necessary, thrusters on the Russian Orbital Segment can alter the station's orbital altitude, avoiding the debris. These Debris Avoidance Manoeuvres (DAMs) are not uncommon, taking place if computational models show the debris will approach within a certain threat distance. Ten DAMs had been performed by the end of 2009. Usually, an increase in orbital velocity of the order of 1 m/s is used to raise the orbit by one or two kilometres. If necessary, the altitude can also be lowered, although such a manoeuvre wastes propellant. If a threat from orbital debris is identified too late for a DAM to be safely conducted, the station crew close all the hatches aboard the station and retreat into their spacecraft in order to be able to evacuate in the event the station was seriously damaged by the debris. This partial station evacuation has occurred on 13 March 2009, 28 June 2011, 24 March 2012 and 16 June 2015.

In November 2021, a debris cloud from the destruction of Kosmos 1408 by an anti-satellite weapons test threatened the ISS, leading to the announcement of a yellow alert, leading to crew sheltering in the crew capsules. A couple of weeks later, it had to perform an unscheduled maneuver to drop the station by 310 meters to avoid a collision with hazardous space debris.

Sightings from Earth

The ISS is visible to the naked eye as a slow-moving, bright white dot because of reflected sunlight, and can be seen in the hours after sunset and before sunrise, when the station remains sunlit but the ground and sky are dark. The ISS takes about 10 minutes to pass from one horizon to another, and will only be visible part of that time because of moving into or out of the Earth's shadow. Because of the size of its reflective surface area, the ISS is the brightest artificial object in the sky (excluding other satellite flares), with an approximate maximum magnitude of −4 when in sunlight and overhead (similar to Venus), and a maximum angular size of 63 arcseconds. The ISS, like many satellites including the Iridium constellation, can also produce flares of up to 16 times the brightness of Venus as sunlight glints off reflective surfaces. The ISS is also visible in broad daylight, albeit with a great deal more difficulty.

Tools are provided by a number of websites such as Heavens-Above (see Live viewing below) as well as smartphone applications that use orbital data and the observer's longitude and latitude to indicate when the ISS will be visible (weather permitting), where the station will appear to rise, the altitude above the horizon it will reach and the duration of the pass before the station disappears either by setting below the horizon or entering into Earth's shadow.

In November 2012 NASA launched its "Spot the Station" service, which sends people text and email alerts when the station is due to fly above their town. The station is visible from 95% of the inhabited land on Earth, but is not visible from extreme northern or southern latitudes.

Under specific conditions, the ISS can be observed at night on five consecutive orbits. Those conditions are 1) a mid-latitude observer location, 2) near the time of the solstice with 3) the ISS passing in the direction of the pole from the observer near midnight local time. The three photos show the first, middle and last of the five passes on 5–6 June 2014.

Astrophotography

Using a telescope-mounted camera to photograph the station is a popular hobby for astronomers, while using a mounted camera to photograph the Earth and stars is a popular hobby for crew. The use of a telescope or binoculars allows viewing of the ISS during daylight hours.

Transits of the ISS in front of the Sun, particularly during an eclipse (and so the Earth, Sun, Moon, and ISS are all positioned approximately in a single line) are of particular interest for amateur astronomers.

International co-operation

Involving five space programs and fifteen countries, the International Space Station is the most politically and legally complex space exploration programme in history. The 1998 Space Station Intergovernmental Agreement sets forth the primary framework for international cooperation among the parties. A series of subsequent agreements govern other aspects of the station, ranging from jurisdictional issues to a code of conduct among visiting astronauts.

Following the 2022 Russian invasion of Ukraine, continued cooperation between Russia and other countries on the International Space Station has been put into question. British Prime Minister Boris Johnson commented on the current status of cooperation, saying "I have been broadly in favour of continuing artistic and scientific collaboration, but in the current circumstances it's hard to see how even those can continue as normal." On the same day, Roscosmos Director General Dmitry Rogozin insinuated that Russian withdrawal could cause the International Space Station to de-orbit due to lack of reboost capabilities, writing in a series of tweets, "If you block cooperation with us, who will save the ISS from an unguided de-orbit to impact on the territory of the US or Europe? There's also the chance of impact of the 500-ton construction in India or China. Do you want to threaten them with such a prospect? The ISS doesn't fly over Russia, so all the risk is yours. Are you ready for it?" Rogozin later tweeted that normal relations between ISS partners could only be restored once sanctions have been lifted, and indicated that Roscosmos would submit proposals to the Russian government on ending cooperation. NASA stated that, if necessary, US corporation Northrop Grumman has offered a reboost capability that would keep the ISS in orbit.

On 26 July 2022, Yury Borisov, Rogozin's successor as head of Roscosmos, submitted to Russian President Putin plans for withdrawal from the programme after 2024. However, Robyn Gatens, the NASA official in charge of the space station, responded that NASA had not received any formal notices from Roscosmos concerning withdrawal plans.

Participating countries
  (1997–2007)
 
  European Space Agency

End of mission

According to the Outer Space Treaty, the United States and Russia are legally responsible for all modules they have launched. Several possible disposal options were considered: Natural orbital decay with random reentry (as with Skylab), boosting the station to a higher altitude (which would delay reentry), and a controlled targeted de-orbit to a remote ocean area. In late 2010, the preferred plan was to use a slightly modified Progress spacecraft to de-orbit the ISS. This plan was seen as the simplest, cheapest and with the 

OPSEK was previously intended to be constructed of modules from the Russian Orbital Segment after the ISS is decommissioned. The modules under consideration for removal from the current ISS included the Multipurpose Laboratory Module (Nauka), launched in July 2021, and the other new Russian modules that are proposed to be attached to Nauka. These newly launched modules would still be well within their useful lives in 2024.

At the end of 2011, the Exploration Gateway Platform concept also proposed using leftover USOS hardware and Zvezda 2 as a refuelling depot and service station located at one of the Earth–Moon Lagrange points. However, the entire USOS was not designed for disassembly and will be discarded.

On 30 September 2015, Boeing's contract with NASA as prime contractor for the ISS was extended to 30 September 2020. Part of Boeing's services under the contract related to extending the station's primary structural hardware past 2020 to the end of 2028.

There have also been suggestions in the commercial space industry that the station could be converted to commercial operations after it is retired by government entities.

In July 2018, the Space Frontier Act of 2018 was intended to extend operations of the ISS to 2030. This bill was unanimously approved in the Senate, but failed to pass in the U.S. House. In September 2018, the Leading Human Spaceflight Act was introduced with the intent to extend operations of the ISS to 2030, and was confirmed in December 2018. Congress later passed similar provisions in its CHIPS and Science Act, signed into law by President Joe Biden on 9 August 2022.

In January 2022, NASA announced a planned date of January 2031 to de-orbit the ISS using a deorbit module and direct any remnants into a remote area of the South Pacific Ocean.

Cost
The ISS has been described as the most expensive single item ever constructed. As of 2010, the total cost was US$150 billion. This includes NASA's budget of $58.7 billion ($89.73 billion in 2021 dollars) for the station from 1985 to 2015, Russia's $12 billion, Europe's $5 billion, Japan's $5 billion, Canada's $2 billion, and the cost of 36 shuttle flights to build the station, estimated at $1.4 billion each, or $50.4 billion in total. Assuming 20,000 person-days of use from 2000 to 2015 by two- to six-person crews, each person-day would cost $7.5 million, less than half the inflation-adjusted $19.6 million ($5.5 million before inflation) per person-day of Skylab.

In film 
Beside numerous documentaries such as the IMAX documentaries Space Station 3D from 2002, or A Beautiful Planet from 2016, the ISS is subject of feature films such as The Day After Tomorrow (2004), Life (2017), Love (2011), ortogether with the Chinese station Tiangong space stationin Gravity (2013).

See also
 A Beautiful Planet – 2016 IMAX documentary film showing scenes of Earth, as well as astronaut life aboard the ISS
 Center for the Advancement of Science in Space – operates the US National Laboratory on the ISS
 List of commanders of the International Space Station
 List of space stations
 List of spacecraft deployed from the International Space Station
 Politics of outer space
 Science diplomacy
 Space Station 3D – 2002 Canadian documentary

Notes

References

Attribution:

Further reading
 
 
 O'Sullivan, John. European Missions to the International Space Station: 2013 to 2019 (Springer Nature, 2020).
 Ruttley, Tara M., Julie A. Robinson, and William H. Gerstenmaier. "The International Space Station: Collaboration, Utilization, and Commercialization." Social Science Quarterly 98.4 (2017): 1160–1174. online

External links

 
 ISS Location

Agency ISS websites
  Canadian Space Agency
  European Space Agency
  Centre national d'études spatiales (National Centre for Space Studies)
  German Aerospace Center
  Italian Space Agency
  Japan Aerospace Exploration Agency
  S.P. Korolev Rocket and Space Corporation Energia 
  Russian Federal Space Agency 
  National Aeronautics and Space Administration

Research
 NASA: Daily ISS Reports
 NASA: Station Science
 ESA: Columbus
 RSC Energia: Science Research on ISS Russian Segment

Live viewing

 Live ISS webcam by NASA at uStream.tv
 Live HD ISS webcams by NASA HDEV at uStream.tv
 Sighting opportunities at NASA.gov
 Complete Orbital Position at KarhuKoti.com
 Real-time position at Heavens-above.com
 Real-time tracking and position at uphere.space

Multimedia
 Johnson Space Center image gallery at Flickr.com
 ISS tour with Sunita Williams by NASA at YouTube.com
 Journey to the ISS by ESA at YouTube.com
 The Future of Hope, Kibō module documentary by JAXA at YouTube.com
 Seán Doran's compiled videos of orbital photography from the ISS: Orbit – Remastered, Orbit: Uncut; The Four Seasons, Nocturne – Earth at Night, Earthbound, The Pearl (see Flickr album for more)

 
Satellites in low Earth orbit
Populated places established in 1998
Spacecraft launched in 1998
Articles containing video clips
International science experiments
Science diplomacy
Canada–United States relations
Japan–United States relations
Russia–United States relations
Crewed spacecraft
Space stations
NASA space stations
Space program of Russia
European Space Agency programmes
Space program of Japan
Space program of Canada
Joint ventures